Charlestown is an electoral district of the Legislative Assembly in the Australian state of New South Wales. It has been represented by Jodie Harrison of the Labor Party since the Charlestown by-election on 25 October 2014.

It is located within Greater Newcastle and includes part of the City of Lake Macquarie (including Charlestown, Kahibah,  Whitebridge, Dudley, Gateshead, Mount Hutton, Windale, Kotara South, Cardiff, Hillsborough, Warners Bay, Eleebana and Tingira Heights) and a small part of the City of Newcastle (including Adamstown and Kotara).

History

The seat was created in 1971, replacing parts of the abolished districts of Hamilton and Kahibah. It was held continuously by Labor until the 2011 election, when it was won by Andrew Cornwell of the Liberal Party. Cornwell became an independent and moved to the crossbench on 6 August 2014 after accusations at ICAC. He resigned from parliament on 12 August 2014 after evidence of corruption was uncovered. Jodie Harrison won the subsequent by-election.

Members for Charlestown

Election results

References

Charlestown
1971 establishments in Australia
Constituencies established in 1971
Politics of Newcastle, New South Wales
City of Lake Macquarie